Nelson High School can refer to:
Nelson High School (Ontario), in Burlington, Ontario, Canada
Byron Nelson High School (Texas)
Thomas Nelson High School, in Bardstown, Kentucky
Nelson County High School, also in Bardstown, Kentucky
Nelson County High School, in Lovingston, Virginia